Jacques-Pierre Amette (born 1943 in Saint-Pierre-sur-Dives, Calvados, German-occupied France) is a French writer. In 2003 his novel Brecht's Mistress (French: La Maîtresse de Brecht) won the Prix Goncourt. He has been a correspondent for The New York Times and a journalist for several French newspapers.

Bibliography

novels 
1965: Le Congé
1966: Élisabeth Skerla
1974: La Vie comme ça
1977: Bermuda
1978: La Nuit tombante
1981: Jeunesse dans une ville normande
1985: Enquête d'hiver
1987: L'Après-midi
1992: La Peau du monde
1995: Province
1997: Les Deux Léopards (Prix Contrepoint 1997)
1999: L'Homme du silence
2001: Ma vie, son œuvre
2003: Brecht's Mistress (2005 UK) / Brecht's Lover (2005 US) / La Maîtresse de Brecht (2003 FR)
2009: Journal météorologique

Romans noirs 
 Exit, Éditions Gallimard, (Série noire) n°1850 (1981) , reprint Gallimard, series  n°3010 (1997)  under the pseudonym Paul Clément
 Je tue à la campagne, Gallimard, Série noire n°1896 (1982) , reprint Gallimard, series  n°230 (2001)  under the pseudonym Paul Clément
 , Albin Michel  (2007) , reprint LGE, Le Livre de Poche n°3219 (2010)

Tales 
1970: Un voyage en province
1986: Confessions d'un enfant gâté (Prix Roger Nimier 1986)
1991: Le Voyage d'Hölderlin en France 
1993: L'adieu à la raison
1994: Stendhal : 3 juin 1819
2007: Un été chez Voltaire
2012: Liaison romaine

Short stories 
1973: Les lumières de l'Antarctique

Theatre 
 1974: Les Sables mouvants
 1989: Le Maître-nageur
 1989: Les Environs de Heilbronn
 1991: Après nous
 1991: La Waldstein
 1992: Le Mal du pays
 1992: Singe
 1992: Passions secrètes, crimes d'avril 
 1993: Appassionata
 1997: La Clairière
 2005: Le Tableau de Poussin

Honours 
 1986: Prix Roger-Nimier for Confessions d'un enfant gâté
 1997: Prix Contrepoint for Les Deux Léopards
 1992: Prix CIC du Théâtre for Passions secrètes, crimes d'avril
 2003: Prix Goncourt for La Maîtresse de Brecht (édition dite « du Centenaire »)
 2007:

References 

1943 births
Living people
People from Saint-Pierre-en-Auge
Writers from Normandy
20th-century French male writers
French crime fiction writers
French male non-fiction writers
20th-century French novelists
21st-century French novelists
French male short story writers
French short story writers
20th-century French dramatists and playwrights
21st-century French dramatists and playwrights
20th-century French journalists
21st-century French male writers
University of Caen Normandy alumni
Prix Goncourt winners
Roger Nimier Prize winners